"Call Me a Mack" is the debut single released by R&B artist Usher for the soundtrack album Poetic Justice. "Call Me a Mack" was released separately in 1993 for Epic Records and was produced by Tim Thomas and Teddy Bishop. The song peaked at #56 on the Billboard's Hot R&B/Hip-Hop Songs chart.

Track listing

A-side
"Call Me a Mack"

B-side
"Call Me a Mack" (Extramental)

US Vinyl, 12"
"Call Me a Mack" [Vincent's 48Hr Mix] - 6:20 
"Call Me a Mack" [Xtra Bit] - 4:03 
"Call Me a Mack" [Album Version] - 4:03 
"Call Me a Mack" [Crazycool Mix] - 5:32 
"Call Me a Mack" [Percussamental] - 4:39

Charts

References

1993 debut singles
Usher (musician) songs
New jack swing songs
Music videos directed by F. Gary Gray
Songs written by Usher (musician)
1993 songs